Villava is a town and municipality located in the province and autonomous community of Navarre, northern Spain. The population is about 10,000, and the town is located 4 km away from Pamplona, the capital of Navarre.

The village was founded in 1184 by King Sancho VI the Wise of Navarre. For several centuries, Villava was just a little town, but in the 1960s, it grew considerably and became an important industrial suburb of Pamplona.

The area of the town is small (just 1 square km), and thus it is not expected to continue growing. It has a large industrial area dedicated mainly to the paper industry, informatics and bus assembly. The town has a good commercial area.

Notable people
Pedro de Atarrabia (died 1347), theologian
Miguel Induráin (born 1964), cyclist

References

External links
 VILLAVA/ATARRABIA in the Bernardo Estornés Lasa - Auñamendi Encyclopedia (Euskomedia Fundazioa) 
 Villava-Atarrabia's town hall website

Municipalities in Navarre